Jon-Michael William Ecker (born March 16, 1983) is an American actor. He is known for his roles as Aaron Morales in Popland!, Pablo Peralta in the telenovela Corazón valiente, Nicolás de la Vega in Gossip Girl: Acapulco, Marlon Brando in the film Cantinflas and Güero Dávila in Queen of the South.

He is the son of Brazilian-born American actor Guy Ecker.

Filmography

Film roles

Television roles

References

External links 
 

1983 births
Living people
American male television actors
American male soap opera actors
People from San Marcos, Texas
Expatriate male actors in Mexico
Brazilian actors